Cystangium balpineum, better known as the white sessile truffle, is a basidiomycete mushroom.

See also 

 Truffle

References

Russulales
Taxa named by Cheryl A. Grgurinovic